Fred J. Murphy (born February 20, 1938) is a former player in the National Football League. He played for the Cleveland Browns and the Minnesota Vikings. He played college football for the Georgia Tech Yellow Jackets.

External links
Profile at NFL.com

1938 births
Living people
American football defensive ends
Georgia Tech Yellow Jackets football players
Cleveland Browns players
Minnesota Vikings players
Players of American football from Atlanta